The 1988 World Figure Skating Championships were held in Budapest, Hungary from March 22 to 27. Medals were awarded in men's singles, ladies' singles, pair skating, and ice dancing.

Medal tables

Medalists

Medals by country

Results

Men
Kurt Browning of Canada landed the first ratified quadruple jump (a toe loop) in his free skating. Jozef Sabovcik of Czechoslovakia had landed a quad toe loop at the 1986 European Championships which was recognized at the event but then ruled invalid three weeks later due to a touchdown with his free foot.

Ladies

Pairs

Ice dancing

References

External links

 results
 http://sportsillustrated.cnn.com/vault/article/magazine/MAG1067164/index.htm
 https://web.archive.org/web/20110603230816/http://www.isu.org/vsite/vfile/page/fileurl/0%2C11040%2C4844-148236-165452-56215-0-file%2C00.pdf
 http://articles.latimes.com/1988-03-26/sports/sp-201_1_world-figure-skating-championships

World Figure Skating Championships
World Figure Skating Championships
World Figure Skating Championships
International figure skating competitions hosted by Hungary
March 1988 sports events in Europe
International sports competitions in Budapest
1980s in Budapest